WSYW (810 AM) is a commercial radio station in Indianapolis, Indiana.  It broadcasts a Spanish language adult contemporary radio format, branded as Exitos 94.3.  The station is owned by Continental Broadcast Group, LLC.

By day, WSYW is powered at 250 watts non-directional.  Because 810 AM is a clear-channel frequency, on which KGO San Francisco and WGY Schenectady share Class A status, WSYW's AM transmitter must sign off at night to avoid interference.  Programming is heard around the clock on 250 watt FM translator W232DM at 94.3 MHz.

History
On , the station signed on as WIGO.  Luke Walton was owner and general manager with George L. Davis as one of the disc jockeys.  Studios were in the basement level of office building at 143 Delaware St.  

In 1966, station was sold to Sarkes Tarzian, who changed the format to a home grown easy listening format and the new call sign WATI. 

It was sold to Continental Broadcast Group, LLC, with the call letters changed to WGRT on December 14, 1984.  On February 15, 1990, the station changed its call sign to the current WSYW.

Previous formats include hip-hop music known as "Yo! 8-1-0," children's music known as Radio AAHS, and classical music as a simulcast of 107.1 (now WEDJ). Another children's show, MY FIRST RADIO, aired for less than a year.  It ran from 7:30 to 8:30am weekdays and was produced by Stuart Lowry and Jim Walsh (of WITT).

On October 28, 2019, WSYW changed its format to Spanish language Adult Contemporary, branded as "Exitos 94.3," simulcast on FM translator W232DM (94.3 FM), as part of a format swap with sister station WNTS (1590 AM).

Previous logo

References

External links

FCC History Cards for WSYW

SYW
Mass media in Indianapolis
SYW
SYW
1963 establishments in Indiana
Radio stations established in 1963
Mainstream adult contemporary radio stations in the United States